José Luis Biescas (born 1 June 1939) is a Spanish boxer. He competed in the men's featherweight event at the 1960 Summer Olympics.

References

External links
 

1939 births
Living people
Spanish male boxers
Olympic boxers of Spain
Boxers at the 1960 Summer Olympics
People from Tarazona y el Moncayo
Sportspeople from the Province of Zaragoza
Featherweight boxers